"Someone Is Waiting for You (The Greater Mother Love Song)" is a World War I song written and composed by Al Piantadosi. The song was first published in 1917 by Al. Piantadosi & Co., Inc. in New York City. The sheet music cover features an older woman sitting by an open door of a rustic home.

The sheet music can be found at the Pritzker Military Museum & Library.

References 

Bibliography

1917 songs
Songs about mothers
Songs of World War I
Songs written by Al Piantadosi